Malavika Krishnadas (born 7 January 1999) is an Indian actress, television presenter and classical dancer. She took part in the Malayalam talent-hunt reality show Nayika Nayakan on Mazhavil Manorama. She made her movie debut through Thattumpurath Achuthan. She played the lead role on television serial Indulekha aired on Surya TV.

Early life and career
Malavika was born in Ottapalam to Usha, a housewife and late Krishnadas, a businessman and was brought up in Pattambi. She started learning classical dance at the age of three.

Malavika started her career through television dance reality show Super Dancer Junior 2 on Amrita TV. She was one among the finalists and became the runner-up of the show. She lost her father when in Grade VII during her first gulf dance show. Then she went on to be part of Munch Dance Dance telecasted on Asianet. She was a regular participant on dance competitions in Kerala State Kalotsav and won the first prize at state level in Bharatanatyam when she was in Class X. She completed her schooling from TRKHSS, Vaniyamkulam, Palakkad. She then trained Bharatanatyam under Vannadil Pudiyaveettil Dhananjayan and Shanta Dhananjayan. She pursued her bachelor's degree in Business from Sacred Heart College, Thevara.

She returned to mini-screen as a contestant on Nayika Nayakan, a talent-hunt reality show telecasted on Mazhavil Manorama. The show was a breakthrough in her career as she became the second runnerup and also bagged the best dancer title. She made her movie debut in the same year through Thattumpurath Achuthan directed by Lal Jose. She then became part of a webseries Life jor and a musical album Mizhi randilum.

She started her career as a television host through D5 Junior on Mazhavil Manorama as she replaced her Nayika Nayakan co-contestant Vincy Aloshious to anchor the show. She then went on to anchor Funny Nights on Zee Keralam along with Suraj Venjaramood. Her debut serial was Amme Mahamaye on Surya TV in 2016. She played the female lead in television serial Indulekha on Surya TV.
On 27 December 2022, she confirmed that her marriage got fixed with Mazhavil Manorama show Nayika-Nayakan fame Thejus Jyothi through her youtube channel.

Filmography

Films

Television

Special appearances

Webseries

Music videos

References

External links
 

Living people
Indian women television presenters
Actresses in Malayalam television
Performers of Indian classical dance
Indian female classical dancers
1999 births
Actresses in Malayalam cinema
Actresses from Palakkad
People from Ottapalam
Indian television presenters
Indian film actresses
Indian television actresses
21st-century Indian actresses